The Peak Galleria is a leisure and shopping complex and a tourist attraction located at Victoria Gap, near the summit of Victoria Peak on Hong Kong Island, Hong Kong. It is owned and run by Hang Lung Properties. It includes a bus terminus for public buses run by New World First Bus and a green minibus route that serves the Peak. The complex is adjacent to the Peak Tower, another leisure and shopping complex, which houses the upper terminus of the Peak Tram.

The shopping complex houses a number of eateries. It also has a free-entry observatory deck on level 3, which is larger than the one at the Peak Tower.

History
The building has been situated at its site since 1993.

From 2013 until its closure in 2018, Hong Kong Trams Station, a museum and gift shop focused on the history of Hong Kong Tramways, was located in the complex.

In 2016, Hang Lung Properties began renovations and the restaurant Cafe Deco, which had been located in the mall for 22 years, closed.

In 2019, Hang Lung Properties renovated the entrance of the mall.

See also
Tourism in Hong Kong

References

External links
 The Peak Galleria homepage

Shopping malls established in 1993
Shopping centres in Hong Kong
Victoria Peak
Hang Lung Group
1993 establishments in Hong Kong